Sudley is a census-designated place (CDP) in Prince William County, Virginia, United States. As of the 2010 census, Sudley comprises what in the 2000 census were the Sudley and West Gate CDPs. Sudley's population including West Gate was 16,203 at the 2010 census, and excluding West Gate was 7,719 at the 2000 census.

Sudley contains the Splash Down Waterpark. Residents of Sudley are represented in the Virginia House of Delegates by Danica Roem.

Geography
Sudley is located at  (38.792783, −77.498784).

According to the United States Census Bureau, the CDP has a total area of 1.6 square miles (4.0 km2), all of it land.

Demographics

2000 borders
As of the census of 2000, there were 7,719 people, 2,640 households, and 1,998 families residing in the CDP. The racial makeup of the CDP was 75.41% White, 11.88% African American, 0.48% Native American, 3.72% Asian, 0.12% Pacific Islander, 5.10% from other races, and 3.29% from two or more races. Hispanic or Latino of any race were 9.29% of the population.

There were 2,640 households, out of which 41.5% had children under the age of 18 living with them, 59.1% were married couples living together, 11.8% had a female householder with no husband present, and 24.3% were non-families. 16.7% of all households were made up of individuals, and 2.6% had someone living alone who was 65 years of age or older. The average household size was 2.92 and the average family size was 3.30.

In the CDP, the population was spread out, with 29.1% under the age of 18, 8.7% from 18 to 24, 35.1% from 25 to 44, 22.4% from 45 to 64, and 4.7% who were 65 years of age or older. The median age was 32 years. For every 100 females, there were 98.2 males. For every 100 females age 18 and over, there were 97.7 males.

The median income for a household in the CDP was $67,033, and the median income for a family was $67,246. Males had a median income of $46,196 versus $32,038 for females. The per capita income for the CDP was $26,322. About 3.3% of families and 4.1% of the population were below the poverty line, including 7.7% of those under age 18 and none of those age 65 or over.

References

External links

 Prince William Conservation Alliance

 
Census-designated places in Prince William County, Virginia
Washington metropolitan area
Unincorporated communities in Virginia
Census-designated places in Virginia